Better Movies is a 1925 American short silent comedy film directed by Robert F. McGowan. It was the 44th Our Gang short subject released.

Cast

The Gang
 Joe Cobb as Joe
 Jackie Condon as Jackie
 Mickey Daniels as Mickey
 Johnny Downs as Johnny
 Allen Hoskins as Farina
 Mary Kornman as Mary
 Jay R. Smith as Turkey-egg
 Martha Sleeper as Teenaged 'Vamp'
 Billy Lord as Rich kid (unconfirmed)
 Pal the Dog as himself

Additional cast
 Jackie Hanes as Baby in audience 
 Bobby Young as Audience member
 William Gillespie as Officer
 Lyle Tayo as Billy's Mother

See also
 Our Gang filmography

References

External links

1925 films
1925 comedy films
1925 short films
American silent short films
American black-and-white films
Films directed by Robert F. McGowan
Hal Roach Studios short films
Our Gang films
1920s American films
Silent American comedy films